Chetvertnia is a village in Volyn Oblast, Ukraine. The village is famous for being the estate Czetwertyński family.

In the 15-17th centuries the village was considered a city.

In 1437 Oleksandr Chetvertynsky established in a city Transfiguration Monastery. Sometime at the end of 16th century the city belonged to the House of Zbaraski when Prince Janusz Zbaraski married Hanna Czetwertyńska. In 1604 here was established a church Transfiguration of Our Lord. Upon extinguishing of House of Zbaraski family line, the estate was returned to Czetwertyński family.

References

Czetwertyński

Villages in Kamin-Kashyrsky Raion